Wayne Kramer may refer to:

Wayne Kramer (filmmaker) (born 1965), South African film writer and director
Wayne Kramer (guitarist) (born 1948), American guitarist